Tinchebray is a former commune in the Orne department in the Lower Normandy region in north-western France. On 1 January 2015, Tinchebray and six other communes merged becoming one commune called Tinchebray-Bocage.

History
It was the scene of the Battle of Tinchebray fought on 28 September 1106.

During the Second World War, it was liberated by Allied forces on 15th August 1944.

Heraldry

See also
Communes of the Orne department

References

Former communes of Orne